Danny Lew Staples (April 1, 1932 – July 22, 2003) was a Missouri politician and former state senator from Eminence, Missouri.  He served for 20 years in the Missouri Senate (1983-2003) and 6 years in the Missouri House (1976-1982).  Before becoming a politician, Stapes was a truck driver.  During his career in the state senate, he chaired committees for the Missouri state transportation and prison systems.

Personal life 
Danny Staples was married to Barbara Staples.  He had 2 children from a previous marriage, Robin and Richard. Barbara had 3 children from a previous marriage, Jeannine, Janet, and Joe.

Notes

1932 births
2002 deaths
Members of the Missouri House of Representatives
Missouri state senators
20th-century American politicians
People from Eminence, Missouri